The 2011–12 Toronto Raptors season was the 17th season of the franchise in the National Basketball Association (NBA).  The season start was delayed, and the season schedule was compressed due to the 2011 NBA lockout. The Raptors finished the season with a 23–43 record and did not make it to the playoffs.

Key dates
 June 23: The 2011 NBA draft took place at Prudential Center in Newark, New Jersey.
 December 26: Toronto started the regular season with a win against the Cleveland Cavaliers.

Draft picks

Roster

Pre-season

Game log

|- bgcolor="#ffcccc"
| 1
| December 18
| Boston Celtics
| 
| Andrea Bargnani (16)
| Ed Davis (10)
| José Calderón (6)
| Air Canada Centre16,721
| 0–1
|- bgcolor="ffcccc"
| 2
| December 21
| @ Boston Celtics
| 
| Andrea Bargnani (20)
| DeMar DeRozan (10)
| Jerryd BaylessJames Johnson (3)
| TD Garden18,624
| 0–2
|-

Regular season

Standings

Record vs. opponents

Game log

|- bgcolor=#ccffcc
| 1
| December 26
| @ Cleveland
| 
| José CalderónDeMar DeRozan (15)
| Amir Johnson (13)
| José Calderón (11)
| Quicken Loans Arena20,562
| 1–0
|- bgcolor=#ffcccc
| 2
| December 28
| Indiana
| 
| DeMar DeRozan (22)
| Amir Johnson (10)
| José Calderón (6)
| Air Canada Centre19,800
| 1–1
|- bgcolor=#ffcccc
| 3
| December 30
| @ Dallas
| 
| Andrea Bargnani (30)
| Andrea Bargnani (7)
| José Calderón (7)
| American Airlines Center20,307
| 1–2

|- bgcolor=#ffcccc
| 4
| January 1
| @ Orlando
| 
| Andrea Bargnani (28)
| Andrea Bargnani (7)
| José Calderón (13)
| Amway Center18,846
| 1–3
|- bgcolor=#ccffcc
| 5
| January 2
| @ New York
| 
| Andrea BargnaniDeMar DeRozan (21)
| Rasual ButlerJamaal Magloire (10)
| José Calderón (12)
| Madison Square Garden19,763
| 2–3
|- bgcolor=#ccffcc
| 6
| January 4
| Cleveland
| 
| Andrea Bargnani (31)
| James Johnson (8)
| José Calderón (11)
| Air Canada Centre14,468
| 3–3
|- bgcolor=#ffcccc
| 7
| January 6
| New Jersey
| 
| José Calderón (19)
| Amir Johnson (10)
| José Calderón (8)
| Air Canada Centre16,771
| 3–4
|- bgcolor=#ffcccc
| 8
| January 7
| @ Philadelphia
| 
| Andrea Bargnani (21)
| Amir Johnson (14)
| José Calderón (7)
| Wells Fargo Center14,522
| 3–5
|- bgcolor=#ccffcc
| 9
| January 9
| Minnesota
| 
| Andrea Bargnani (31)
| Amir Johnson (11)
| José Calderón (6)
| Air Canada Centre14,097
| 4–5
|- bgcolor=#ffcccc
| 10
| January 10
| @ Washington
| 
| Andrea Bargnani (22)
| Amir Johnson (10)
| José Calderón (8)
| Verizon Center14,077
| 4–6
|- bgcolor=#ffcccc
| 11
| January 11
| Sacramento
| 
| Leandro Barbosa (24)
| Andrea Bargnani (10)
| José Calderón (10)
| Air Canada Centre14,323
| 4–7
|- bgcolor=#ffcccc
| 12
| January 13
| Indiana
| 
| DeMar DeRozan (23)
| Ed Davis (10)
| José Calderón (9)
| Air Canada Centre15,302
| 4–8
|- bgcolor=#ffcccc
| 13
| January 14
| @ Chicago
| 
| DeMar DeRozan (15)
| Amir Johnson (13)
| José Calderón (8)
| United Center21,962
| 4–9
|- bgcolor=#ffcccc
| 14
| January 16
| @ Atlanta
| 
| Leandro Barbosa (22)
| Ed Davis (11)
| José Calderón (11)
| Philips Arena11,050
| 4–10
|- bgcolor=#ffcccc
| 15
| January 18
| @ Boston
| 
| Gary Forbes (18)
| Ed Davis (9)
| José Calderón (4)
| TD Garden18,624
| 4–11
|- bgcolor=#ffcccc
| 16
| January 20
| Portland
| 
| James Johnson (23)
| Ed Davis (10)
| José Calderón (13)
| Air Canada Centre17,537
| 4–12
|- bgcolor=#ffcccc
| 17
| January 22
| @ L. A. Clippers
| 
| Leandro Barbosa (19)
| DeMar DeRozanAaron Gray (8)
| Jerryd Bayless (5)
| Staples Center19,060
| 4–13
|- bgcolor=#ccffcc
| 18
| January 24
| @ Phoenix
| 
| Andrea Bargnani (36)
| James JohnsonLinas Kleiza (10)
| José Calderón (11)
| US Airways Center15,404
| 5–13
|- bgcolor=#ccffcc
| 19
| January 25
| @ Utah
| 
| Andrea BargnaniLinas Kleiza (25)
| DeMar DeRozan (8)
| José CalderónJerryd Bayless (7)
| EnergySolutions Arena19,802
| 6–13
|- bgcolor=#ffcccc
| 20
| January 27
| @ Denver
| 
| Leandro Barbosa (19)
| Aaron Gray (11)
| Linas Kleiza (4)
| Pepsi Center18,855
| 6–14
|- bgcolor=#ccffcc
| 21
| January 29
| @ New Jersey
| 
| DeMar DeRozan (27)
| Ed Davis (9)
| José Calderón (9)
| Prudential Center14,319
| 7–14
|- bgcolor=#ffcccc
| 22
| January 31
| Atlanta
| 
| Jerryd Bayless (14)
| Ed Davis (11)
| José Calderón (9)
| Air Canada Centre16,117
| 7–15

|- bgcolor=#ffcccc
| 23
| February 1
| @ Boston
| 
| Jerryd Bayless (14)
| Ed Davis (12)
| José Calderón (7)
| TD Garden18,624
| 7–16
|- bgcolor=#ccffcc
| 24
| February 3
| Washington
| 
| Leandro Barbosa (19)
| Amir Johnson (13)
| José Calderón (17)
| Air Canada Centre16,382
| 8–16
|- bgcolor=#ffcccc
| 25
| February 5
| @ Miami
| 
| DeMar DeRozan (25)
| Ed Davis (8)
| James Johnson (4)
| American Airlines Arena19,802
| 8–17
|- bgcolor=#ffcccc
| 26
| February 6
| @ Washington
| 
| Linas KleizaJerryd Bayless (30)
| Amir Johnson (10)
| James Johnson (6)
| Verizon Center14,687
| 8–18
|- bgcolor=#ffcccc
| 27
| February 8
| Milwaukee
| 
| DeMar DeRozan (25)
| Linas Kleiza (8)
| José Calderón (15)
| Air Canada Centre15,291
| 8–19
|- bgcolor=#ccffcc
| 28
| February 10
| Boston
| 
| DeMar DeRozan (21)
| Amir Johnson (12)
| José Calderón (14)
| Air Canada Centre19,207
| 9–19
|- bgcolor=#ffcccc
| 29
| February 12
| L. A. Lakers
| 
| José Calderón (30)
| Ed Davis (8)
| DeMar DeRozan (7)
| Air Canada Centre19,311
| 9–20
|- bgcolor=#ffcccc
| 30
| February 14
| New York
| 
| José Calderón (25)
| Linas Kleiza (11)
| José Calderón (9)
| Air Canada Centre20,092
| 9–21
|- bgcolor=#ffcccc
| 31
| February 15
| San Antonio
| 
| DeMar DeRozan (29)
| Amir Johnson (7)
| José Calderón (11)
| Air Canada Centre15,999
| 9–22
|- bgcolor=#ffcccc
| 32
| February 17
| Charlotte
| 
| DeMar DeRozan (24)
| Amir Johnson (15)
| José Calderón (8)
| Air Canada Centre15,575
| 9–23
|- bgcolor=#ccffcc
| 33
| February 22
| Detroit
| 
| DeMar DeRozan (23)
| Aaron Gray (12)
| José Calderón (15)
| Air Canada Centre17,125
| 10–23
|- bgcolor=#ffcccc
| 34
| February 28
| @ Houston
| 
| DeMar DeRozan (17)
| Ed Davis (15)
| José Calderón (7)
| Toyota Center13,337
| 10–24
|- bgcolor=#ccffcc
| 35
| February 29
| @ New Orleans
| 
| Jerryd BaylessDeMar DeRozan (21)
| Amir Johnson (7)
| José Calderón (6)
| New Orleans Arena14,527
| 11–24

|- bgcolor=#ffcccc
| 36
| March 2
| Memphis
| 
| Jerryd Bayless (18)
| Aaron GrayLinas Kleiza (12)
| José Calderón (9)
| Air Canada Centre 18,056
| 11–25
|- bgcolor=#ccffcc
| 37
| March 4
| Golden State
| 
| DeMar DeRozan (25)
| Amir Johnson (13)
| Three players (4)
| Air Canada Centre 18,056
| 12–25
|- bgcolor=#ffcccc
| 38
| March 5
| Orlando
| 
| DeMar DeRozan (23)
| Aaron Gray (11)
| James JohnsonJosé Calderón (7)
| Air Canada Centre 15,392
| 12–26
|- bgcolor=#ccffcc
| 39
| March 7
| Houston
| 
| DeMar DeRozan (23)
| Amir Johnson (8)
| José Calderón (12)
| Air Canada Centre 14,597
| 13–26
|- bgcolor=#ffcccc
| 40
| March 10
| @ Detroit
| 
| DeMar DeRozan (15)
| Three players (5)
| Jerryd Bayless (4)
| The Palace of Auburn Hills 16,090
| 13–27
|- bgcolor=#ffcccc
| 41
| March 11
| Milwaukee
| 
| DeMar DeRozan (21)
| Ed Davis (10)
| Jerryd Bayless (6)
| Air Canada Centre 17,316
| 13–28
|- bgcolor=#ccffcc
| 42
| March 13
| @ Cleveland
| 
| Jerryd Bayless (20)
| Amir Johnson (9)
| Jerryd Bayless (7)
| Quicken Loans Arena14,203
| 14–28
|- bgcolor=#ffcccc
| 43
| March 14
| @ New Jersey
| 
| Jerryd BaylessJames Johnson (16)
| Amir Johnson (9)
| Jerryd Bayless (10)
| Prudential Center10,701
| 14–29
|- bgcolor=#ccffcc
| 44
| March 16
| @ Memphis
| 
| Jerryd Bayless (28)
| Andrea BargnaniJames Johnson (7)
| Jerryd Bayless (9)
| FedExForum17,239
| 15–29
|- bgcolor=#ffcccc
| 45
| March 17
| @ Charlotte
| 
| Jerryd Bayless (29)
| Ed Davis (12)
| Jerryd Bayless (6)
| Time Warner Cable Arena15,108
| 15–30
|- bgcolor=#ffcccc
| 46
| March 20
| @ New York
| 
| DeMar DeRozan (17)
| Ed Davis (9)
| José Calderón (9)
| Madison Square Garden19,763
| 15–31
|- bgcolor=#ffcccc
| 47
| March 21
| Chicago
| 
| DeMar DeRozan (23)
| Aaron GrayLinas Kleiza (8)
| José Calderón (8)
| Air Canada Centre17,869
| 15–32
|- bgcolor=#ccffcc
| 48
| March 23
| New York
| 
| DeMar DeRozan (30)
| Three players (7)
| José Calderón (10)
| Air Canada Centre19,800
| 16–32
|- bgcolor=#ffcccc
| 49
| March 24
| @ Chicago
| 
| José CalderónJames Johnson (20)
| Gary Forbes (13)
| José Calderón (10)
| United Center21,841
| 16–33
|- bgcolor=#ffcccc
| 50
| March 26
| Orlando
| 
| Gary Forbes (21)
| Jamaal Magloire (7)
| José Calderón (11)
| Air Canada Centre16,429
| 16–34
|- bgcolor=#ccffcc
| 51
| March 28
| Denver
| 
| Andrea Bargnani (26)
| Gary Forbes (10)
| José Calderón (10)
| Air Canada Centre15,867
| 17–34
|- bgcolor=#ffcccc
| 52
| March 30
| Miami
| 
| DeMar DeRozan (28)
| Amir Johnson (12)
| José Calderón (16)
| Air Canada Centre19,883
| 17–35

|- bgcolor=#ccffcc
| 53
| April 1
| Washington
| 
| Andrea Bargnani (18)
| Andrea BargnaniAaron Gray (8)
| José Calderón (8)
| Air Canada Centre16,858
| 18–35
|- bgcolor=#ccffcc
| 54
| April 3
| Charlotte
| 
| Andrea Bargnani (30)
| Aaron Gray (9)
| José Calderón (11)
| Air Canada Centre14,640
| 19–35
|- bgcolor=#ccffcc
| 55
| April 4
| @ Philadelphia
| 
| Andrea Bargnani (24)
| Ed Davis (14)
| José Calderón (13)
| Wells Fargo Center18,186
| 20–35
|- bgcolor=#ffcccc
| 56
| April 6
| Cleveland
| 
| DeMar DeRozan (28)
| Linas Kleiza (8)
| DeMar DeRozan (4)
| Air Canada Centre16,565
| 20–36
|- bgcolor=#ffcccc
| 57
| April 8
| @ Oklahoma City
| 
| José Calderón (19)
| Aaron Gray (10)
| José Calderón (6)
| Chesapeake Energy Arena18,203
| 20–37
|- bgcolor=#ffcccc
| 58
| April 9
| @ Indiana
| 
| Alan Anderson (17)
| Ed Davis (10)
| José Calderón (14)
| Bankers Life Fieldhouse11,021
| 20–38
|- bgcolor=#ffcccc
| 59
| April 11
| Philadelphia
| 
| Alan AndersonEd Davis (13)
| Ed Davis (13)
| Ed Davis (5)
| Air Canada Centre16,324
| 20–39
|- bgcolor=#ccffcc
| 60
| April 13
| Boston
| 
| DeMar DeRozan (22)
| Ed Davis (12)
| Ben Uzoh (5)
| Air Canada Centre17,270
| 21–39
|- bgcolor=#ccffcc
| 61
| April 15
| @ Atlanta
| 
| DeMar DeRozan (23)
| Aaron GrayLinas Kleiza (7)
| Justin Dentmon (4)
| Philips Arena13,845
| 22–39
|- bgcolor=#ffcccc
| 62
| April 16
| Atlanta
| 
| DeMar DeRozan (22)
| Ben Uzoh (10)
| Ben Uzoh (8)
| Air Canada Centre15,992
| 22–40
|- bgcolor=#ffcccc
| 63
| April 18
| @ Miami
| 
| James Johnson (18)
| Solomon AlabiJames Johnson (6)
| Alan Anderson (3)
| American Airlines Arena19,600
| 22–41
|- bgcolor=#ffcccc
| 64
| April 22
| @ Detroit
| 
| DeMar DeRozan (16)
| Solomon Alabi (10)
| Gary ForbesJames Johnson (4)
| The Palace of Auburn Hills14,370
| 22–42
|- bgcolor=#ffcccc
| 65
| April 23
| @ Milwaukee
| 
| James Johnson (22)
| James Johnson (13)
| Gary ForbesBen Uzoh (5)
| Bradley Center13,867
| 22–43
|- bgcolor=#ccffcc
| 66
| April 26
| New Jersey
| 
| Ed Davis (24)
| Solomon Alabi (19)
| Ben Uzoh (12)
| Air Canada Centre18,161
| 23–43

Player statistics

Season

|-style="text-align:center"
| 
| 14 || 0 || 8.7 || .361 ||  || .875 || 3.4 || .2 || .1 || .6 || 2.4
|-style="text-align:center"
| 
| 17 || 12 || 27.1 || .387 || .393 || .853 || 2.0 || 1.5 || .3 || .2 || 9.6
|-style="text-align:center"
| 
| 42 || 0 || 22.5 || .436 || .360 || .835 || 1.9 || 1.5 || .9 || .2 || 12.2
|-style="text-align:center"
| 
| 31 || 31 || 33.3 || .432 || .296 || .873 || 5.5 || 2.0 || .6 || .5 ||style="background:#000000;color:#D3D3D3;"|19.5
|-style="text-align:center"
| 
| 31 || 11 || 22.7 || .424 ||style="background:#000000;color:#D3D3D3;"|.423 || .852 || 2.1 || 3.8 || .8 || .1 || 11.4
|-style="text-align:center"
| 
| 34 || 14 || 13.3 || .308 || .273 || .583 || 1.9 || .6 || .2 || .1 || 3.2
|-style="text-align:center"
| 
| 53 || 53 || 33.9 || .457 || .371 ||style="background:#000000;color:#D3D3D3;"|.882 || 3.0 ||style="background:#000000;color:#D3D3D3;"|8.8 || .9 || .1 || 10.5
|-style="text-align:center"
| 
| 24 || 0 || 8.7 || .321 || .294 || .800 || 1.4 || 1.4 || .3 || .2 || 2.0
|-style="text-align:center"
| 
|style="background:#000000;color:#D3D3D3;"|66 || 9 || 23.2 || .513 || .000 || .670 ||style="background:#000000;color:#D3D3D3;"|6.6 || .9 || .6 || 1.0 || 6.3
|-style="text-align:center"
| 
| 63 ||style="background:#000000;color:#D3D3D3;"|63 ||style="background:#000000;color:#D3D3D3;"|35.0 || .422 || .261 || .810 || 3.3 || 2.0 || .8 || .3 || 16.7
|-style="text-align:center"
| 
| 4 || 0 || 18.0 || .364 || .200 || .667 || 1.8 || 2.3 || .3 || .0 || 5.5
|-style="text-align:center"
| 
| 48 || 2 || 14.9 || .413 || .349 || .725 || 2.1 || 1.1 || .5 || .1 || 6.6
|-style="text-align:center"
| 
| 49 || 40 || 16.6 || .516 ||  || .532 || 5.7 || .6 || .4 || .3 || 3.9
|-style="text-align:center"
| 
| 64 || 43 || 24.3 ||style="background:#000000;color:#D3D3D3;"|.576 || .400 || .690 || 6.4 || 1.2 || .5 || 1.1 || 7.1
|-style="text-align:center"
| 
| 62 || 40 || 25.2 || .450 || .317 || .704 || 4.7 || 2.0 ||style="background:#000000;color:#D3D3D3;"|1.1 ||style="background:#000000;color:#D3D3D3;"|1.4 || 9.1
|-style="text-align:center"
| 
| 49 || 3 || 21.6 || .402 || .346 || .810 || 4.1 || .9 || .5 || .1 || 9.7
|-style="text-align:center"
| 
| 34 || 1 || 11.0 || .378 ||  || .259 || 3.3 || .2 || .1 || .3 || 1.2
|-style="text-align:center"
| 
| 16 || 8 || 22.3 || .351 || .000 || .579 || 3.9 || 3.7 || 1.0 || .2 || 4.8
|}
  Statistics with the Toronto Raptors.

Injuries
 On March 26 Jerryd Bayless had a partial tear in his left oblique muscle during a game against the Orlando Magic and was out for the remainder of the season.

Transactions

Overview

Trades

Free agents

Many players signed with teams from other leagues due to the 2011 NBA lockout. FIBA allows players under NBA contracts to sign and play for teams from other leagues if the contracts have opt-out clauses that allow the players to return to the NBA if the lockout ends. The Chinese Basketball Association, however, only allows its clubs to sign foreign free agents who could play for at least the entire season.

References

Toronto Raptors seasons
Toronto Raptors
Tor